The 1924 Dissolution Honours List was issued on 7 November 1924 at the advice of the outgoing Prime Minister, Ramsay MacDonald.

Privy Council
 William Graham MP, Financial Secretary to the Treasury
 Benjamin Charles Spoor MP, Parliamentary Secretary to the Treasury

Order of St.Michael and St. George

Knight Commander (KCMG)
 Sir Cecil James Barrington Hurst, KCB KC, Legal advisor to the Foreign Office.

Royal Victorian Order

Commander (CVO)
 Walford Harmood Montague Selby, MVO
 Charles Patrick Duff

References

Dissolution Honours
Dissolution Honours 1924